Monomotapa United is a football club based in Harare, Zimbabwe. The club plays in the [[Zimbabwe Division one

Honours 
Zimbabwe Premier Soccer League: 1
2008

Squad 

Football clubs in Zimbabwe
Sport in Harare
2003 establishments in Zimbabwe